Dorothy Shea is an American career diplomat who has served as the United States Ambassador to Lebanon since 2020. On December 7, 2022, she received the Distinguished Presidential Rank Award for sustained extraordinary accomplishment. On January 3, 2023, President Biden announced his intention to nominate her as Deputy Representative of the United States of America to the United Nations, with the rank and status of Ambassador Extraordinary and Plenipotentiary, and Deputy Representative of the United States of America in the Security Council of the United Nations as well as Representative of the United States of America to the Sessions of the General Assembly of the United Nations.

Education 
Shea earned a Bachelor of Arts from the University of Virginia, a Master of Science from Georgetown University, and a Master of Science from the National War College.

Career 
She is a career member of the Senior Foreign Service, class of Minister-Counselor. She had served as Deputy Principal Officer at the United States Consulate General in Jerusalem, as Director of the Office of Assistance for Asia and the Near East in the Bureau of Population, Refugees, and Migration, and as a Pearson Fellow with the Senate Foreign Relations Committee. She was also the Political/Economic Counselor at the United States Embassy in Tunis, Tunisia, a Political Officer at the United States Embassy in Tel Aviv, Israel, a Director for Democracy and Human Rights at the National Security Council, and a Special Assistant to the Special Envoy for War Crimes Issues in the United States Department of State. Prior to her appointment as Ambassador she served as Deputy Chief of Mission of the U.S. Embassy, Cairo, Egypt from 2017 to 2020.

United States Ambassador to Lebanon
On October 11, 2019, President Trump announced his intent to nominate Shea to be the next United States Ambassador to Lebanon. On October 17, 2019, her nomination was sent to the United States Senate. On December 17, 2019, a hearing was held on her nomination before the Senate Foreign Relations Committee. On January 15, 2020, her nomination was reported out of committee. On February 11, 2020, her nomination was unanimously confirmed by voice vote. She presented her credentials to President Michel Aoun on March 11, 2020.

Media ban
Within a few months after assuming her ambassadorship in Lebanon, Shea vocally criticized Hezbollah, a militant group and political organization in Lebanon which is labelled a terrorist organization by the United States and several other countries. Shea accused Hezbollah of interfering in attempts to improve Lebanon's devastated economy and of draining billions of dollars in funds from the Lebanese government. She also criticized a speech by Hezbollah's leader Hassan Nasrallah blaming the United States for the economic crisis. In June 2020, following her remarks, Judge Mohammad Mazeh accused her of violating the Vienna Convention on Diplomatic Relations. He said that her comments interfered in Lebanon's internal affairs, "offended many Lebanese," and increased sectarian tensions. Mazeh passed an order preventing her from making any public statement, as well as forbidding any local or foreign media outlet working in Lebanon from conducting interviews with her or on pain of a $200,000 fine. However, the decision was not implemented, and Mazeh was called to appear before the Judicial Inspection Board. He refused and submitted his resignation. Justice Minister Marie-Claude Najm accepted it on 14 July.

Personal life 
Shea speaks French and Arabic.

See also
List of ambassadors of the United States

References

Living people
21st-century American diplomats
Ambassadors of the United States to Lebanon
American women ambassadors
Georgetown University alumni
National War College alumni
United States Department of State officials
United States Foreign Service personnel
University of Virginia alumni
Year of birth missing (living people)
21st-century American women
American women diplomats